Everyone Is Someone is the fourth studio album by Canadian band Dala. It was released on June 9, 2009.

Track listing

Personnel
 Sheila Carabine - Lead and background vocals, acoustic guitars, piano, keyboards, mandolin
 Amanda Walther - Lead and background vocals, acoustic guitars, piano, keyboards
 Mike Roth - Electric and acoustic guitars (tk 1,9) and keyboards (tk 6), producer, engineer
 Daniel Roth - Electric and acoustic guitars (tk 1,3,10), handclaps (tk 4,11)
 Gary Craig - Drums and percussion
 Adrian Walther - Lead bass (tk 1,9)
 Michael Carabine - Electric and acoustic guitars (tk 2)
 Dennis Pendrith - Bass (tk 4,5,7,10)
 Maria Jacobsson - Harp
 Kevin Fox - Cello (tk 1)
 Ashley Summers - Bass (tk 2,3)
 Chris Bilton - Keyboards and string arrangements (tk 3,5) and keyboards (tk 4), handclaps (tk 4,11)
 Asher Lenz - Keyboards (tk 4,11)
 Doug Cameron - Mandolin (tk 2,7) and banjo (tk 4)
 Adam Crossley - Handclaps (tk 4,11)
 Adrian Vanelli - Additional drums (tk 1)
 Tim Walther - Cow bell
 Andrew Carabine - Icicle keyboards

Reception
Everyone Is Someone was released to critical acclaim. It earned Dala their fifth Canadian Folk Music Award nomination, a Toronto Independent Music Award for Best Folk Group, and was touted by The Irish Post as the Album of the Year. The song Horses was nominated by National Public Radio in the US as one of the Top Ten folk songs of 2009.  The lead single Levi Blues was nominated in the Mainstream Adult Contemporary category at the 2010 Canadian Radio Music Awards.

References

External links

2009 albums
Dala (band) albums